Connecticut is home to the WNBA's Connecticut Sun and several minor league sports teams, although it has not had a men's major league franchise since the Hartford Whalers of the NHL relocated to Raleigh, North Carolina in 1997.

Baseball
 Hartford Yard Goats
 The Hartford Yard Goats are a minor league baseball team that was founded in 2016 when the New Britain Rock Cats relocated to Hartford. The franchise is a Colorado Rockies affiliate in the AA Eastern League. Their home stadium is Dunkin' Donuts Park.

Basketball
 Connecticut Sun
 The Connecticut Sun are a women's professional basketball team in the WNBA (Women's National Basketball Association). The Sun plays at the Mohegan Sun Arena inside the Mohegan Sun Resort and Casino in Uncasville. After an April training camp, they play a 34-game season that lasts from May to August.

Football
 Western Connecticut Hawks
 The (Western) Connecticut Hawks are a women's professional tackle football team in the Women's Football Alliance in Division III. The Hawks play at Kaplanis Memorial Fields in Danbury.
 Northern Connecticut Nightmare
 The Northern Connecticut Nightmare are a developmental women's tackle football team in the Women's Football Alliance.  The Nightmare play at Windsor High School.

Hockey
 Bridgeport Islanders
 The Bridgeport Islanders are a hockey team based in Bridgeport, Connecticut that plays in the American Hockey League (AHL). They are affiliated with the NHL's New York Islanders. They play their home games at Total Mortgage Arena.
 Hartford Wolf Pack
 The Hartford Wolf Pack is a hockey team based in Hartford that plays in the American Hockey League (AHL). They are affiliated with the New York Rangers of the NHL. They play their home games at the XL Center.
 Connecticut Whale
 The Connecticut Whale is a professional women's ice hockey team based in Danbury, Connecticut that plays in the Premier Hockey Federation (PHF) and was founded in 2015. Its name and colors are an homage to Connecticut's former NHL franchise, the Hartford Whalers.

The Danbury Hat Tricks is a Single-A hockey team that plays in the Federal Prospects Hockey League. They play their games at the Danbury Ice Arena in Danbury, CT. The team is known for its rowdy fans who sit in section 102.

Soccer

 Hartford Athletic
 The Hartford Athletic is a soccer team that plays in the USL Championship. They play their home matches at Trinity Health Stadium.

References

  
 

Connecticut
Connecticut sports-related lists
Sports teams in Connecticut